Chehel Cheshmeh-ye Koruni (also Romanized as Chehel Cheshmeh-ye Korūnī; also known as Chehel Cheshmeh) is a village in Dasht-e Arzhan Rural District, Arzhan District, Shiraz County, Fars Province, Iran. At the 2006 census, its population was 1,164, in 231 families.

References 

Populated places in Shiraz County